Pötting is a municipality in the district of Grieskirchen in the Austrian state of Upper Austria.

Geography
Pötting lies in the Hausruckviertel. About 5 percent of the municipality is forest, and 84 percent is farmland.

References

Cities and towns in Grieskirchen District